The Pied Piper of Guadalupe is a 1961 Warner Bros. Looney Tunes cartoon directed by Friz Freleng. The short was released on August 19, 1961, and stars Speedy Gonzales and Sylvester.

It was nominated at the 34th Academy Awards in the category of Best Animated Short.

Plot

After being taunted and mocked by the mice in Guadalupe, Sylvester imitates the Pied Piper of Hamelin in an attempt to lure the mice of Mexico, so he can trap them in a jar. But his flute has no effect on Speedy Gonzales, the fastest mouse in all of Mexico, when he decides to rescue his friends, one by one.

Synopsis
Sylvester finds himself being constantly teased by the local mice as they outsmart him at every turn, going so far as to bonk him on the head with a two-by-four when he insults them, no matter how far away he is from their hole. Hoping to get even with them, Sylvester is inspired by a book based on the Pied Piper of Hamelin, and goes to take music lessons on the flute. Once he is well-studied with the flute, he returns to get his payback on the mice. At first, when the mice see him, they ridicule him, but their taunting comes to an abrupt end when Sylvester plays the Mexican Hat Dance on his flute. One by one, the tune entrances the mice and makes them dance out to Sylvester, who then conks them on the head with his flute and places them in a large bottle.

The rest of the mice are soon captured, and any countermeasures the mice attempt to implement fail. Just as Sylvester thinks he's finally gotten his revenge on the mice, he soon discovers that he missed Speedy Gonzales. Speedy demands his friends back, but Sylvester refuses, even taunting Speedy to try to rescue them. Calling Sylvester's bluff, Speedy makes for the bottle and manages to rescue one before Sylvester can even put the cork back in. Angered, Sylvester tries to lure Speedy in via his flute, but Speedy merely pretends to be hypnotized, and when Sylvester tries to bonk him, Speedy dodges and clobbers him in turn.

Later, Sylvester hides from Speedy in a wooden barrel. When he hears him coming, Sylvester lights a stick of dynamite to throw out at Speedy, but Speedy flanks him from behind and hops on the barrel, using his speed to start the barrel rolling. The barrel rolls down some stairs and envelops a dog sleeping at the bottom. The dynamite goes off, charring Sylvester and the dog, after which the now angry dog chases after Sylvester.

As Speedy continues his rescue operation, Sylvester is waiting behind an archway on a motorcycle, and when Speedy passes, Sylvester gives chase. After a long pursuit, Speedy abruptly stops at a cliff edge, and Sylvester plunges over the edge and into the lake below. After some trouble with restarting the bike underwater, Sylvester struggles back up the cliff. Speedy sees him coming and lures Sylvester towards a one-way street, and while Speedy hides by the sign, Sylvester drives straight in and collides with a bus coming from the opposite direction.

Sylvester later emerges from the hospital covered in bandages and bruises, only for Speedy to catch up to him and offer him his flute back. However, after what he's been through, Sylvester declines. Speedy thanks Sylvester, but as he begins to play it, Sylvester's bandaged leg begins to wiggle to the tune, and he helplessly dances after Speedy, yowling in pain.

References

External links

1961 films
1961 short films
1961 comedy films
1961 animated films
1960s English-language films
1960s Warner Bros. animated short films
Looney Tunes shorts
Films based on Pied Piper of Hamelin
Speedy Gonzales films
Sylvester the Cat films
Films set in Mexico
Short films directed by Friz Freleng
Films scored by Milt Franklyn
Warner Bros. Cartoons animated short films